The members of the National Assembly of Zambia from 1969 until 1973 were elected on 19 December 1968. Of the 105 elected members, 81 were from the United National Independence Party and 23 from the Zambian African National Congress, together with a single independent. Five additional members were nominated.

List of members

Elected members

Replacements by by-election

Non-elected members

Replacements

References 

1969